Pugnaso curtirostris, the pug-nosed pipefish, is a species of pipefish endemic to the coastal waters of southern Australia. This species grows to a length of  SL. This species is the only known member of its genus.

References

Syngnathidae
Taxa named by Gilbert Percy Whitley
Fish described in 1872